Nik Shahr (also Romanized as Nīk Shahr; also known simply as Nīk; formerly, Geh and Keh) is a city in and the capital of Nik Shahr County, Sistan and Baluchestan province, Iran. At the 2006 census, its population was 13,267, in 2,365 families. At the 2016 census, its population had risen to 17,732.

References

Populated places in Nik Shahr County

Cities in Sistan and Baluchestan Province